Jarlmanns saga ok Hermanns (also known as Hermanns saga ok Jarlmanns) is a medieval Icelandic romance saga. The saga contains the first written evidence for the Icelandic circle dance form known as hringbrot, which is also the first Icelandic attestation of elves dancing.

Synopsis

Kalinke and Mitchell summarise the saga thus:

The foster-brothers Hermann (son of the king of Frakkland) and Jarlmann (son of an earl) are of an age and have been educated together. Hermann sends Jarlmann to Miklagarðr to sue for the hand of Ríkilát. She has previously rejected many suitors, but Jarlmann wins her for Hermann by means of a magic ring. She cannot return with Jarlmann, however, until the armed forces of another suitor have been repelled. When the wedding finally takes place, Ríkilát is mysteriously abducted and imprisoned by the old king Rudent of Serkland who plans to marry her. Jarlmann feigns love for Þorbjörg, a giantess who guards Ríkilát, and a double wedding ceremony (Rudent-Ríkilát, Jarlmann-Þorbjörg) ensues. Hermann kills the old king and regains his abducted bride, while Jarlmann kills the giantess in the bridal bed. The foster-brothers and Ríkilát return to Frakkland for a second double wedding ceremony. Jarlmann marries the king's sister Herborg and receives half of the kingdom.

The saga survives in two main versions from the Middle Ages, one more learned in tone (traditionally referred to as the older version) and one more orientated to telling a lively narrative (traditionally referred to as the younger version). Recent scholarship, however, reads the two versions as both deriving from and making changes to an earlier original version.

Influences

Jarlmanns saga ok Hermanns is viewed as a specific and intentional response to Konráðs saga, to which its shorter version contains an explicit reference: it deals, of course, with the hero's relationship with a faithful, though unjustly suspected, companion'. 'The author of Jarlmanns saga ok Hermanns was acquainted not only with indigenous Icelandic romances, such as Konráðs saga, but also with the Old Norse translation Tristrams saga ok Isondar, from which the proxy wooing, the bride as leech, and the problem of the proxy wooer as lover presumably derive. The hall-of-statues episode in Tristrams saga seems to have been the inspiration for the scene in which Jarlmann draws a picture of Hermann for Ríkilát to obtain her consent to the marriage'.

Manuscripts

The saga is attested in more manuscripts than almost any other Icelandic saga, around 70; the only competitor is Mágus saga jarls.  There are two main early versions: a generally longer, more highbrow and probably earlier version, first attested in Eggertsbók (AM 556a-b 4to, from the later fifteenth century), and a generally shorter, more dynamic, probably younger version. Recent research suggests, however, that these two versions are probably independent adaptations of a lost common original, rather than the shorter version being adapted from the longer. Most manuscripts are held in Iceland and elsewhere in Europe, though a few, such as Fiske Icelandic Collection, Cornell University, Ithaca, New York: Ic F75 A125, 8° are in North America.

The following list of manuscripts is based on the survey by Kalinke and Mitchell, on Handrit.is, and on the Stories for All Time survey of fornaldarsaga manuscripts. Links to online catalogue entries are provided where available.

Editions and translations

Agnete Loth (ed.), Late Medieval Icelandic Romances, Editiones Arnamagæanae, series B, 20–24, 5 vols Copenhagen: Munksgaard, 1962–65, III 1-66. (The earlier version, with an English paraphrase.)
 Jarlmanns saga ok Hermanns i yngre handskrifters redaktion, ed. by Hugo Rydberg (Copenhagen: Møller, 1917). (The younger version.)
 Riddarasögur, ed. by Bjarni Vilhjálmsson, 6 vols (Reykjavík: Íslendingasagnaútgáfan, 1949-1951), VI 171-235. (Normalised version of Rydberg's text.)
 Jarlmanns och Hermanns Saga; efter Islandska Handskrifter utgifven med upplysande Anmarkningar, ed. by Joh. G. Liljegren (Stockholm: Zacharias Haeggström, 1819) (Swedish translation)
 Philip Lavender and others, 'Jarlmanns saga og Hermanns: A Translation', Scandinavian-Canadian Studies/Études Scandinaves au Canada, 27 (2020), 50-104: PDF format, XHTML format. (Normalises and translates Rydberg's edition of the younger version.)

References

Chivalric sagas
Icelandic literature
Old Norse literature